Susie Appleby (born 21 December 1970; also known as Susan Kathryn Appleby) is a former English female rugby union player. She represented  at the 1998 Women's Rugby World Cup. She was an assistant coach for the England Women’s sevens.

She is currently a police officer. She was a runner-up on SAS: Are You Tough Enough?

References

1970 births
Living people
England women's international rugby union players
English female rugby union players